The men's 50 kilometres race walk at the 1968 Summer Olympics in Mexico City, Mexico was held on October 17. It was won by Christoph Höhne of East Germany.

Records
Prior to this event, the world and Olympic records stood as follows:

Result

References

External links
 Official Olympic Report, la84foundation.org. Retrieved August 13, 2012.

Athletics at the 1968 Summer Olympics
Racewalking at the Olympics
Men's events at the 1968 Summer Olympics